The Indian anchovy (Stolephorus indicus), also known as Hardenberg's anchovy,  is a species of oceanodromous ray-finned fish in the family Engraulidae. It is known as handalla (හැදැල්ලා) in Sri Lanka, where it is widely sold at most markets and supermarkets. It is widely used as a live or dead bait in tuna fishery.

It is called Kapsali in Konkani in Goa. 

It is called Verli in konkani in Goa

Description
It is a small schooling fish found in depth of 20-50m in most of the tropical areas of the Indo-pacific ocean from Madagascar and Mauritius eastward to Australia and further east to Samoa westwards. Recently recorded for the first time in the Mediterranean Sea (off Israel, 2015), it probably migrated via the Suez Canal. It is likely present in adjacent countries but overlooked in the Mediterranean due to its external resemblance to other engraulids in the region. 

Maximum length do not exceed 15.5 cm. It has 15 to 17 dorsal soft rays and 18 to 21 anal soft rays. There are 2 to 6 small needle-like  scutes on the belly region. Maxilla tip is pointed, reaching front border of pre-operculum. Body is a typical engraulid form with light transparent fleshy brown, and silver stripe down flank. Indian anchovy usually feeds on planktons.

This fish is part of the cuisine of the Indian and Southeast Asian marine regions. It can be crisp-fried, used to make fish-based culinary products like fish sauce or in curries. In Sri Lanka, this variety of fish is made into a tasty snack by dipping in a batter of flour, then rolled in bread crumbs and deep fried in oil. It is also popular as a ‘white curry’, i.e.a curry made with coconut milk. A spicier variant is made with dry chilli gravy and served with scraped fresh coconut to offset the hotness of the gravy.

See also
List of fish in India
List of marine bony fishes of South Africa
Fish of the Red Sea
List of common commercial fish of Sri Lanka

References

Fish of Thailand
Stolephorus
Fish described in 1823
Taxa named by Johan Conrad van Hasselt